Countdown is the first Japanese-language studio album (fifth overall) by South Korean–Chinese boy band Exo. It was released by Avex Trax and SM Entertainment Japan on January 31, 2018. The album contains previously released Japanese tracks along with four new songs, including the lead song "Electric Kiss".

Release
On November 4, 2017, Exo was announced to be releasing their first Japanese studio album on January 24, 2018. Ahead of the release of the music video for "Electric Kiss", Exo shared individual member teaser clips from November 18 to November 25 for their upcoming Japanese album. The release was later postponed to January 31, 2018. Member Lay is heard in the six previously released songs but did not participate in recording for the new songs due to conflicts with his promotional schedules in China.

Promotion
Exo performed "Electric Kiss" for the first time on January 26, 2018 on the Japanese morning TV show Sukkiri. On January 27 and 28, Exo added "Electric Kiss" and "Cosmic Railway" to the set list of their tour Exo Planet #4 – The ElyXion in Saitama and Osaka.

Commercial performance
The album debuted atop the Oricon Weekly Album Chart, making Exo the first international group to have their first single and full album in Japan reach number one on Oricon's weekly chart. Countdown also continued in first place on Oricon's daily album chart for three consecutive days after its release, marking first place four times in total during the first week.

According to Oricon, Exo's album recorded an estimated 89,000 units in sales within the first week of release.

On February 9, 2018, the Recording Industry Association of Japan (RIAJ) announced that Countdown had sold over 100,000 copies and received a gold certification. The album reached the benchmark within only ten days of its release on January 31, 2018.

Track listing

Charts

Certifications

Release history

References

2018 albums
Exo albums
Japanese-language albums
Avex Group albums